Ottaal (English: The Trap) is a 2015 Indian Malayalam film directed by Jayaraj, an adaptation of the short story "Vanka" by Russian author Anton Chekhov. This film stars Ashanth K Sha and Kumarakom Vasudevan, as well as actors Shine Tom Chacko, Sabitha Jayaraj and Thomas G. Kannampuzha.

It became the first movie in India to be released online on the same day as its theatrical release. The film made history, becoming the first ever Malayalam movie to have swept all the top awards in the 20-year history of the International Film Festival of Kerala. The film was one of four Malayalam films selected to be a part of the Indian Panorama at the International Film Festival of India in Goa in November 2015.

Plot
This film tells the story of a young boy (Ashanth K Sha) and his relationship with his grandfather (Kumarakom Vasudevan), his only living relative in the world. Actor Kumarakom Vasudevan is a fisherman in real life, whom Director Jayaraj found during his hunt for actors to play the role. Shine Tom Chacko’s character, Mesthri, also has a pivotal role in the story. Ottaal is an adaptation of one of Anton Chekhov’s timeless works, Vanka. A story of the 18th century, but one that has travelled the time and space to be retold in the present day at a small village in the South of India.

Cast
 Master Ashanth K Sha as Kuttappai
 Kumarakaom Vasudevan as Vallyappachayi
 Shine Tom Chacko as Mesthri
 Thomas J Kannampuzha as Betty
 Sabitha Jayaraj as Moly
 Master Hafis Muhammed as Tinku
 Vavachan as Outha

Soundtrack
The film has one song, "Aa Manathilirrunnu", composed by Padma Bhushan Kavalam Narayana Panicker. The background score composed by Sreevalsan J. Menon was praised by the jury when the film won the Crystal Bear at the Berlinale 2016.

Release and reception

The film was released in theaters in Kerala on 6 November 2015 and online on the same day through Reelmonk, making it the first Indian film to be released simultaneously in theaters and on the internet.

Accolades

References

External links 
 

2015 films
Films directed by Jayaraj
Films scored by Kavalam Narayana Panicker
Films whose writer won the Best Adapted Screenplay National Film Award
Best Film on Environment Conservation/Preservation National Film Award winners
Films about child labour
2010s Malayalam-language films